Puya aristeguietae is a plant species in the genus Puya. This species is endemic to Venezuela.

References

aristeguietae
Flora of Venezuela